Chrysotoxum arcuatum, is a species of hoverfly. It is widespread throughout Britain and Ireland but much more common in the upland districts of the north and west where it is typically found at ground level near woodland and moorland edges. The larvae are thought to feed on root aphids associated with ant colonies.

References

Diptera of Europe
Syrphinae
Flies described in 1758
Taxa named by Carl Linnaeus